Supersexy Swingin' Sounds is a remix album by White Zombie. It was released through Geffen Records in 1996 and was the band's final release. The album consists of remixes of tracks from their previous release, Astro Creep 2000, except "I'm Your Boogie Man" by KC and the Sunshine Band.
The Walmart and Kmart clean version of the album depict the cover model (Merci Montello) in a blue bikini rather than completely nude.

Track listing

Personnel
Adapted from the Supersexy Swingin' Sounds liner notes.

White Zombie
 John Tempesta – drums
 Sean Yseult – bass guitar, art direction
 Jay Yuenger – electric guitar
 Rob Zombie – vocals, illustrations, art direction

Production and additional personnel
 Terry Date – production, engineering
 Michael Fossenkemper – engineering (8)
 Machine – programming (3, 6)
 Stephen Marcussen – mastering
 Brian Tucker – programming (5)
 Ulrich Wild – engineering
 Guitar/Bass Technician  Michael Kaye

Chart positions

Release history

References

External links 
 
 Supersexy Swingin' Sounds at robzombie.com | The official Rob Zombie website

White Zombie (band) albums
Albums produced by Terry Date
1996 remix albums
Geffen Records remix albums
MCA Records remix albums